("In the square of my village") is a Spanish-language song originating during the Spanish Civil War of 1936–1939, and is usually attributed to the anarchist CNT-FAI, a prominent labour organization at the time which sent its own militias to fight alongside the Spanish Republican Army during the Civil War. The melody is that of a Spanish folk song, "," which in turn is attributed to (or, in some accounts, simply written down by) Federico García Lorca.

Lyrics

¹ "" in Spanish can mean either "comrade," in a political context, or something akin to "buddy" if informal. Since this song is very clearly political, it has been translated as "comrade."

See also
Songs of the Spanish Civil War

References

External links
Modern version of the song

Anarchist songs
Spanish-language songs
Songs of the Spanish Civil War
Anarchism in Spain